FC Spartak Shklov is a football club based in Shklov, Mogilev Oblast, Belarus.

History
The club was founded in 1992 and was included in Belarusian Second League for its inaugural season. The club played at the national level during 1992–1993, 1996, 2001–2010 and 2014–2015, including a two-year spell in Belarusian First League (during 2008–2009). In the rest of the seasons, they have been playing in Mogilev Oblast league. 

In some of the seasons, the club was acting as a farm club of Dnepr Mogilev and had a close partnership with local sport schools, which is reflected in some of the club's past names:
Spartak Shklov (1992–2000)
Spartak-UOR-Dnepr Shklov (2001–2002)
Spartak-UOR Shklov (2003–2004)
Spartak Shklov (since 2005)

Current squad
As of October 2022

References

Football clubs in Belarus
Association football clubs established in 1992
1992 establishments in Belarus